is a Japanese former professional baseball infielder, and current the second squad manager for the Fukuoka SoftBank Hawks of Nippon Professional Baseball (NPB).

He previously played for the Fukuoka Daiei Hawks, Fukuoka SoftBank Hawks, the Yomiuri Giants, and had 2,000 hits.

Early baseball career
Kokubo went on to Aoyama Gakuin University, where he became captain and helped his team win its first 1993 Japan National Collegiate Baseball Championship in his senior year.

Professional career

Active player era
Kokubo was selected by the Fukuoka Daiei Hawks in the second round of the 1993 Nippon Professional Baseball draft under the system for expressing a team of choice.

He debuted in the Pacific League in his rookie season of 1994, played in 78 games.

Kokubo was one of Japan's leading power hitters during the 1990s and early 2000s. He hit over 40 home runs in 2001 and 2004, but only led the league in the category once (1995), with only 28 home runs. He also led the league in RBIs in 1997.

He was suddenly given away to the Yomiuri Giants in 2003, despite being the team's cleanup hitter. Kokubo was seemingly given away for free, since the Giants did not give a player to the Hawks in exchange. The motives behind this transaction remain a mystery.

He played with the Yomiuri Giants for three years before signing with his former team (now the Fukuoka SoftBank Hawks) during the 2006 off-season as a free agent.

In 2011, as team captain, he helped lead the Hawks to victory in the Japan Series, winning the  Most Valuable Player Award.

On June 24, 2012, Kokubo recorded his 2,000th career hit, becoming the 41st Japanese professional baseball player to reach the milestone. On August 14 he announced his intention to retire at the end of the 2012 season. His retirement ceremony was held on October 8, after the last regular-season match against the Orix Buffaloes, which SoftBank lost after being no-hit.

After retirement
After his retirement, He worked for NHK as a baseball broadcast commentator.

On December 3 2020, Kokubo became the head coach of the Fukuoka SoftBank Hawks.

Kokubo He has been the second squad manager since the 2022 season.

International career
He won a bronze medal in the 1992 Summer Olympics before entering the Japanese professional leagues.

In October 2013, Kokubo was named the manager of the Japan national baseball team. He led the team to a third place finish at the 2017 World Baseball Classic.

See also
 Nippon Professional Baseball Comeback Player of the Year Award

References

External links

 - Career statistics - NPB.jp 
 90 Hiroki Kokubo PLAYERS2022 - Fukuoka SoftBank Hawks Official site
 Hiroki Kokubo Official site 
 Kokubo pushes teammates to complete at highest level

1971 births
Living people
People from Wakayama (city)
Aoyama Gakuin University alumni
Nippon Professional Baseball infielders
Baseball players at the 1992 Summer Olympics
Olympic baseball players of Japan
Olympic medalists in baseball
Olympic bronze medalists for Japan
Fukuoka Daiei Hawks players
Yomiuri Giants players
Fukuoka SoftBank Hawks players
Medalists at the 1992 Summer Olympics
World Baseball Classic managers